The Royal Albion Hotel (originally the Albion Hotel) is a 3-star hotel in the seaside resort of Brighton, part of the English city of Brighton and Hove.  Built on the site of a house belonging to Richard Russell, a local doctor whose advocacy of sea-bathing and seawater drinking helped to make Brighton fashionable in the 18th century, it has been extended several times, although it experienced a period of rundown and closure in the early 20th century.  A fire in 1998 caused serious damage, but the hotel was restored.

The Classical-style building is in three parts of different sizes and dates but similar appearances.  Large pilasters and columns of various orders feature prominently.  Amon Henry Wilds, an important and prolific local architect, took the original commission on behalf of promoter John Colbatch.  Another local entrepreneur, Harry Preston, restored the hotel to its former high status after buying it in poor condition.  The building took on its present three-wing form in 1963.  The original part of the building was listed at Grade II* by English Heritage for its architectural and historical importance, and its western extension is listed separately at the lower Grade II.

History

Beginnings
The site itself is connected with the life and career of Richard Russell, a doctor who advocated sea water as a cure of ailments. After Russell's death in 1759, Old Steine developed as the centre of fashionable life in Brighton. Russell House, as it became known, was used as lodgings for visitors such as the Duke of Cumberland, and later became an entertainment venue with activities such as a puppet theatre, a camera obscura and resident jugglers.

In the 1820s, it passed to entrepreneur John Colbatch, who demolished it in 1823. The local authorities tried to arrange for the land to be kept as open space, but negotiations collapsed and Colbatch began planning the construction of a hotel.

Construction, success, disrepair

Colbatch commissioned young architect Amon Henry Wilds, who began planning the hotel in 1822.  Wilds, the son of Amon Wilds and an associate of Charles Busby, had been responsible for many building schemes in Brighton from about 1815, when he and his father moved their architectural practice to Brighton.  Schemes already completed by 1822 included King's Road and Brighton Unitarian Church.  The hotel was built on a corner site at the point where Old Steine met King's Road, and like Russell House the main façade faced away from the sea, towards Old Steine.  The four-storey structure opened on 5 August 1826.

The venture was immediately successful, and a stylistically similar five-storey extension was added to the west in about 1847.  At the same time, the name was changed from the Albion Hotel.  Six years earlier, one of Brighton's most important cultural establishments was established in a ground-floor room: the Albion Rooms Literary and Scientific Institution combined the functions of library, lecture theatre and museum.  The venture eventually became unsustainable, and the institution's members presented the accumulated books, artefacts and pictures to Brighton Corporation, the local authority.  This led to the establishment of the Brighton Museum and Art Gallery and Brighton Library in the grounds of the Royal Pavilion.

The hotel fell into disrepair in the late 19th century, and was closed in 1900.  Harry Preston, owner of the nearby Royal York Hotel, bought it in 1913 for £13,500 (£ in ), and quickly restored its fashionable reputation.  The building was completely refurbished, additions were made, and well-known literary figures, artists and entertainers regularly stayed.  The extensions carried out around this time, in the Edwardian style typical of the period, included a sea-facing lounge at the rear of the hotel, and were carried out by Brighton architectural firm Clayton & Black.  Started in the 1870s by Charles Clayton and Ernest Black and continued by their sons, this firm was one of Brighton's most prolific designers of public buildings and churches over the next 60 years.

In 1856, another hotel had been built west of the Royal Albion on land previously occupied by Williams's Royal Hot and Cold Baths, an indoor bath-house.  The Lion Mansion Hotel was architecturally similar to the Royal Albion, and rose to four storeys.  It was later known as the Adelphi Hotel.  In 1963, it was taken over by the Royal Albion, and became physically linked to it as a west wing.

Fire
On the morning of 24 November 1998, the hotel was devastated by a fire which started in the kitchen.  A chef was frying eggs and sausages in a pan; hot fat spilt and caught light, and flames were immediately sucked up a vent to the top floor.  The fire spread quickly, assisted by strong winds, and all 160 people in the building were evacuated.  The Public and Commercial Services Union had to cancel their annual conference, due to be held that day, because of the disruption caused to its delegates, most of whom were staying at the hotel.  About 160 firefighters from all parts of East and West Sussex attended the fire from about 8.20am until late in the evening, in what was later described as Brighton's "biggest firefighting operation for nearly 30 years".  All parts of the hotel were affected by smoke, water and structural damage, but the original corner building was particularly badly affected.

Architecture

In its present form, the Royal Albion Hotel is in three linked sections, all stylistically similar.  The original (eastern) wing is four storeys tall and has five extremely large Corinthian and Composite columns on the north face.  These are flanked on both sides by large pilasters, which also run all round the east face.  The top floor is an attic storey displaying Wilds's characteristic motif: shell designs set in blank rounded tympana.  Above this is a mansard roof, now mostly obscured.  The centre section, dating from about 1847, has three full storeys and two attic floors above, and is therefore taller.  The façade has three bays.  The theme of large pilasters and columns continues, but different styles are used: the left and right bays project slightly and have paired Tuscan pilasters, and a pair of tapering Ionic columns in the centre bay form a distyle in antis composition.  The centre section also has a mansard roof—apparently a later addition.  The western wing (the former Lion Mansions) has a Tuscan-columned porch on the south (seafront) side and a Doric-style equivalent facing north to Old Steine, four Composite pilasters extending for three of the four storeys, small cast-iron balconies and some aedicula-style window surrounds.

Present day
The Royal Albion Hotel was listed at Grade II* on 13 October 1952.  Such buildings are defined as being "particularly important ... [and] of more than special interest".  In February 2001, it was one of 70 Grade II*-listed buildings and structures, and 1,218 listed buildings of all grades, in the city of Brighton and Hove.  The west wing (the former Lion Mansions) was listed at Grade II on 5 August 1999.  In February 2001, it was one of 1,124 buildings listed at that grade in Brighton and Hove; the status indicates that the building is considered "nationally important and of special interest".

The hotel is operated by Britannia Hotels.  There are 208 guest rooms, one restaurant, two bars and five rooms for conferences and meetings.  Bedrooms are classified in four grades, from standard to deluxe.  It has a 3-star rating.

Historical sketches and hotel guests
The Albion was subject of a sketch by painter J. M. W. Turner (1775-1851) in 1834 during one of his coastal expeditions. By 1847 due to its frequent patronage by a number of distinguished visitors, it had changed its name to the Royal Albion and the Royal coat of arms was duly placed over the entrance.

The renowned philanthropist Angela Burdett-Coutts, 1st Baroness Burdett-Coutts (1814–1906), was widely known as ‘the richest heiress in England’ a friend of Charles Dickens and the Duke of Wellington would regularly spend part of the year in the Royal Albion Hotel with her long-term companion, Hannah Brown.

In 1888 a mysterious death occurred in one of the hotel's bedrooms, which featured in the book ‘The Strange Case of Edmund Gurney’. Gurney had been a frequent visitor to Brighton and arrived at the hotel in June, and that evening dined alone and retired early. By two o’clock the following day he had not responded to repeated knocking. The books explores the speculation, was it an overdose or was he murdered?

In February 1894 Oscar Wilde (1854-1900) stayed in a room overlooking the sea whilst working on his Poems in Prose (Wilde collection) the collective title of six prose poems published in July that year in The Fortnightly Review.

In 1906, Harry Preston (1860-1936) a fifty-year-old charismatic local figure in Brighton, a friend of the Prince of Wales, had bought the hotel and four years later he carried out large scale alterations creating a roof garden which overlooked the Palace Pier. In the new refurbished hotel Arnold Bennett (1867-1931) began writing part of his Clayhanger trilogy The Clayhanger Family while staying there in 1910. 
The same year Frenchman Andre Beaumont Jean Louis Conneau (1880-1937) in his Blériot monoplane flew around the skies of Brighton, taking Preston as a passenger. Afterwards he hosted a banquet at the Royal Albion Hotel to celebrate the event. Harry a former publican, had entered the hotel business around the turn of the century. Preston had a wonderful feel for publicity, and he wined and dined the editors of the London newspapers, encouraging them to promote the town and his new hotel to visitors, especially motorists. It started to be referred to as London-by-sea. Harry's wife Ellen died in 1913 and a year later he married Edith Collings, the Royal Albion's manageress. Harry was knighted for his services to charitable causes in 1933, and his wife, Edith, was presented at Court the following year.

In the spring of 1919, the hotel entertained three aristocratic guests - two of whom signed the hotel's register as Sir David (1879-1932) and 'Lady Dorothy' Dalrymple of Newhailes House. Away from the prying eyes of friends in London, the party loving pair were enjoying an affair, but unknown to them both, followed by an enquiry agent employed by Margaret, the ‘real’ Lady Dalrymple, resulting in a divorce. 
The other was Lady Idina Wallace Lady Idina Sackville (1893-1955) –then temporarily staying at the Royal Albion hotel (in between marriages) in Brighton. She was the daughter of Gilbert Sackville, 8th Earl De La Warr, who had earned the nickname ‘Naughty Gilbert’ after running away with a French ‘Can-Can’ dancer. She inherited her father's hedonistic spirit and would scandalise a generation. Over the coming decades she would marry five times and became immortalised as ‘The Bolter’ by novelist Nancy Mitford.

The hotel continued to host many authors, artists, actors and sportsmen throughout the 1920s and 30s.

See also 

Grade II* listed buildings in Brighton and Hove
Grade II listed buildings in Brighton and Hove: P–R

Film location 

 Hotel appears as the final location in the Neil Jordan film Mona Lisa (1986 film) starring Bob Hoskins, Cathy Tyson

References

Notes

Bibliography

External links

Hotels in Brighton and Hove
Grade II* listed buildings in Brighton and Hove
1826 establishments in England
Hotel buildings completed in 1826
Hotels established in 1826